Between The Minds is the debut album by solo artist Jack Savoretti, released on 5 March 2007. It charted at #70 in the UK Albums Chart and includes the singles "Without", "Dreamers", "Between the Minds", and "Dr Frankenstein".

On 31 March 2008, a double-CD version of the album was released in the UK, charting at #195 in the UK Albums Chart. The second disc contains some of the original albums' tracks and additional songs in acoustic and live versions and includes the double A-side single "Gypsy Love"/"One Man Band".

To date the album has spent a total of 6 weeks in the UK Albums Chart, selling 4,603 copies.

Track listing 

 Dreamers - 4:43
 No One's Aware - 3:28
 Dr. Frankenstein - 3:52
 Once Upon a Street - 3:42
 Without - 4:42
 Blackrain - 3:22
 Apologies - 2:59
 Between the Minds - 3:49
 Soldier's Eyes - 3:09
 Lovely Fool - 3:26
 Chemical Courage - 4:31
 Killing Man - 5:36

Between The Minds: Deluxe Edition 
Disc 1
 Dreamers
 No One's Aware
 Dr. Frankenstein
 Once Upon A Street
 Without
 Blackrain
 Apologies
 Between the Minds
 Soldier's Eyes
 Lovely Fool
 Gypsy Love (Jack Savoretti song)
 Chemical Courage
 Killing Man

Disc 2
 One Man Band [acoustic]
 Russian Roulette [acoustic]
 Without [acoustic]
 Killing Man [acoustic]
 Between The Minds [acoustic]
 Dr. Frankenstein [acoustic]
 Blackrain [acoustic]
 Lucy [acoustic]
 Ring of Fire [live from Paris]

Chart position

Release details

References 

2007 debut albums
Jack Savoretti albums